Herman Veenendaal (born September 23, 1947, Arnhem) is a Dutch entrepreneur, investor, and former footballer who played as a centre-forward. Veenendaal spent his entire career for Vitesse Arnhem, making a total of 185 appearances in 6 seasons with his club. In 1974, he was crowned the Eerste Divisie top goalscorer of the 1973-74 season with 23 goals.

References

1947 births 
Dutch footballers
SBV Vitesse players
Eerste Divisie players 
Footballers from Arnhem
Living people
Association football forwards